Gabriel Alejandro Gudiño (born 16 March 1992) is an Argentine professional footballer who plays as a right winger for Huracán.

Career
Gudiño was in the youth ranks of Porteña at the age of 15. His first two clubs in his senior footballing career were Tiro Federal and Las Palmas. After spells at the aforementioned teams, Gudiño joined Torneo Federal A side 9 de Julio in 2015 and went on to score four goals in twenty-eight appearances. He spent the 2016 Torneo Federal A campaign with Libertad, he participated in seventeen matches and scored eight times. In July 2016, Gudiño joined Argentine Primera División club Atlético de Rafaela. He made his top-flight debut on 28 August in a match against Atlético Tucumán, who would win the game.

Almost a year later, Gudiño joined San Lorenzo following the relegation of Rafaela. He scored his first San Lorenzo goal in his tenth appearance for the club, in a 0–2 league win versus Temperley on 29 October 2017. Gudiño was loaned out to Belgrano in January 2019; a move to Colón had previously fallen through. He made eight appearances for Belgrano as they were relegated to Primera B Nacional. On 19 August 2019, Gudiño departed San Lorenzo on loan again as he agreed to go to Spain with Segunda División B outfit Cultural Leonesa. He netted in his first two games versus Bilbao Athletic and Logroñés. He returned to his parent club in August 2020.

Career statistics
.

References

External links
 

1992 births
Living people
Argentine footballers
Argentine expatriate footballers
Footballers from Córdoba, Argentina
Association football midfielders
9 de Julio de Morteros players
Libertad de Sunchales footballers
Atlético de Rafaela footballers
San Lorenzo de Almagro footballers
Club Atlético Belgrano footballers
Cultural Leonesa footballers
Club Atlético Patronato footballers
Club Atlético Huracán footballers
Torneo Argentino B players
Torneo Federal A players
Argentine Primera División players
Segunda División B players
Expatriate footballers in Spain
Argentine expatriate sportspeople in Spain